Dugald Caleb Jackson (13 February 1865, Kennett Square – July 1, 1951) was an American electrical engineer. He received the IEEE Edison Medal for "outstanding and inspiring leadership in engineering education and in the field of generation and distribution of electric power".

Early life
Dugald was born into a quaker family in Kennett Square, Pennsylvania. His parents were Josiah and Mary Price Jackson. His younger brother, John Price Jackson, co-wrote some books with him and also had a career as an electrical engineer, academic, civil servant and soldier. He attended The Hill School in Pottstown before studying civil engineering at Pennsylvania State College from which he graduated in 1885.

Early career
After two years teaching electrical engineering at Cornell University he moved to the University of Wisconsin in 1891 as the first professor of  Electrical Engineering, heading the Department of Electrical Engineering. He specialised in alternating currents and associated machinery alongside technical issues involved in running central stations as independent power stations were known at the time.

At MIT
Jackson headed the Department of Electrical Engineering of the Massachusetts Institute of Technology (MIT) from 1907 to 1935. He was proponent of student and faculty involvement with industry.  Jackson established research as a part of engineering education at MIT and coordinated it with practical experience in industrial settings (for example, with the General Electric Company), and his model spread widely.

On 3 April 1911 Jackson participated in a conference at the Hotel Thorndike, in Boston encouraging closer co-operation between electric vehicle manufacturers and central station managers in the Boston area. The conference was organised by the Boston Edison Company and Jackson promised the support of the Department of Electrical Engineering of the Massachusetts Institute of Technology (MIT) in providing scientific research to support the development of the electric vehicle industry.

Works
 1893 Text Book on Electromagnetism and the Construction of Dynamos
 1895 Electricity and Magnetism
 1896 Alternating Currents and Alternating Current Machinery (with John Price Jackson) New York: Macmillan Co.
 1902 An Elementary Book on Electricity and Magnetism (with John Price Jackson) New York: Macmillan Co.

References

External links
 Biography

IEEE Edison Medal recipients
1865 births
1951 deaths
MIT School of Engineering faculty
American electrical engineers
Penn State College of Engineering alumni
Cornell University College of Engineering alumni
People from Kennett Square, Pennsylvania
Engineers from Pennsylvania